Chah Faleh-ye Sharqi (also Romanized as Chāh Fa‘leh-ye Sharqī; also known as Chāh Fa‘leh and Chāh Qal‘eh) is a village in Qaleh Qazi Rural District, Qaleh Qazi District, Bandar Abbas County, Hormozgan Province, Iran. At the 2006 census, its population was 363, in 79 families.

References 

Populated places in Bandar Abbas County